Metal and Hell is the debut album by Polish heavy metal band Kat. It was released in 1986.

Track listing

Credits
Kat
Roman Kostrzewski – vocals, lyrics, cover design
Piotr Luczyk – guitars, logo design, booklet design
Jacek Regulski – guitars
Krzysztof Oset – bass
Ireneusz Loth – drums

Production
Andrzej Puczyński – production, mixing
Jerzy Kurczak – artwork
Leszek Brzoza – photography
Mirosław Mur-Neinert – cover design
Jarosław Szubrycht – liner notes
Witold Rumian – layout

666 

A Polish version of Metal and Hell was released in 1986, with a slightly different track ordering, which was titled 666. This version was re-recorded in 2015 by Roman Kostrzewski's current project, Kat & Roman Kostrzewski.

Track listing 
All lyrics by Roman Kostrzewski, except where otherwise noted.

Credits
Kat
Roman Kostrzewski – vocals, lyrics
Piotr Luczyk – guitars
Wojciech Mrowiec – guitars
Tomasz Jaguś – bass
Ireneusz Loth – drums

Production
Jos Kloek – engineering
Andrzej Solecki - engineering (assistant)
Piotr Brzeziński - engineering (assistant)
Halina Jarczyk - engineering (assistant)
Piotr Lyczkowski – cover art

References

Kat (band) albums
1986 debut albums
Kat & Roman Kostrzewski albums